Tapseok Station is a station of the U Line in Yonghyeon-dong, Uijeongbu, Gyeonggi-do, South Korea.Line 7 on the Seoul Subway is planned to be extended towards Pocheon, via this station.

Gallery

References

Seoul Metropolitan Subway stations
Metro stations in Uijeongbu
Railway stations opened in 2012